Black sesame rice cake is a Chinese traditional cake made with glutinous rice and sesame.

Rice pudding